Brian Rice (born 11 October 1963) is a Scottish football coach and former player, who currently manages Scottish League One club Alloa Athletic.

Rice played for Hibernian, Nottingham Forest, Grimsby Town, West Bromwich Albion, Stoke City, Falkirk, Dunfermline Athletic, Clyde and Greenock Morton. After his retirement from playing, Rice worked as a coach for Greenock Morton, Airdrieonians, Falkirk, Hibernian, Inverness Caledonian Thistle and St Mirren. He then became a head coach in January 2019, taking charge of Hamilton Academical.

Playing career
Born in Whitburn near Edinburgh, Rice began his career with Hibernian. He made 98 appearances for Hibs in five seasons at Easter Road, scoring 12 goals. During his time at Hibs, Rice won the 1982 European Under-18 Championship with Scotland.

He was signed by Nottingham Forest manager Brian Clough for £175,000 in August 1985. During his time there, Forest won the Football League Cup twice, in 1989 and 1990. He scored a memorable winning goal in the sixth round of the FA Cup against Arsenal in 1988, and became a 'cult hero' with the fans due to his lack of pace.

Whilst a Forest player, Rice had loan spells at Grimsby (making four appearances), West Bromwich Albion (making three appearances) and Stoke City (making 18 appearances in 1990–91). He made 115 appearances for Forest scoring 12 goals.

In August 1991 he returned to Scotland and signed for Falkirk, playing for them until the early part of the 1995–96 season. He then moved to Dunfermline followed by Clyde for two seasons each, and left Clyde at the end of the 1998–99 season.

Coaching career
In 2000, Rice was appointed assistant manager to Ian McCall at Greenock Morton, making one appearance as a player. Rice was then assistant manager to McCall at Airdrieonians, but the club went out of business in 2002. McCall and Rice then both moved to similar positions at Falkirk. McCall eventually moved on to Dundee United, while Rice continued at Falkirk, assisting John Hughes. He helped the club win the First Division in 2005 and reach the 2009 Scottish Cup Final.

Rice followed Hughes in returning to Hibernian when Hughes was appointed manager there in June 2009. Rice also left the club when John Hughes departed as manager by mutual consent in October 2010. As of June 2015, Rice was coaching Al Khor in the Qatar Stars League. He left Al Khor in July 2015 to work for John Hughes at Inverness Caledonian Thistle. Rice continued as assistant manager at Inverness after Richie Foran succeeded Hughes as manager, and then when John Robertson replaced Foran.

Rice left Inverness in June 2018 to take the assistant manager position at St Mirren, working for Alan Stubbs.

Manager
Rice took a lead coaching role for the first time in January 2019, when he was appointed head coach of Hamilton Academical. During January 2020, Rice admitted that he had a gambling addiction. He was banned from working on the touchline for ten matches (five of which were suspended) by the Scottish Football Association because he had regularly bet on football. This led to a wider debate in Scottish football about a perceived gambling culture, and sponsorship of clubs and competitions by gambling companies. He resigned from Hamilton in August 2021.

He was appointed Alloa Athletic manager in February 2022.

Career statistics

Managerial record

Honours
Falkirk
Scottish Challenge Cup: 1993–94

Scotland Youth 
 UEFA European Under-18 Championship: 1982

References

External links
 
 

1963 births
Living people
Footballers from Bellshill
Association football midfielders
Scottish footballers
Scotland under-21 international footballers
Hibernian F.C. players
Nottingham Forest F.C. players
Grimsby Town F.C. players
West Bromwich Albion F.C. players
Stoke City F.C. players
Falkirk F.C. players
Dunfermline Athletic F.C. players
Clyde F.C. players
Greenock Morton F.C. players
Scottish Football League players
English Football League players
Greenock Morton F.C. non-playing staff
Hibernian F.C. non-playing staff
Falkirk F.C. non-playing staff
Inverness Caledonian Thistle F.C. non-playing staff
St Mirren F.C. non-playing staff
Scottish football managers
Hamilton Academical F.C. managers
Alloa Athletic F.C. managers
Scottish Professional Football League managers